Country Dough was a Chinese restaurant at Seattle's Pike Place Market, in the U.S. state of Washington.

Description 
The Chinese restaurant Country Dough operated a Pike Place Market in Central Waterfront, Seattle. The menu included guokui (with beef, chicken, or pork), jianbing, and noodle dishes.

History 
Chef Cheng Biao Yang opened the restaurant in July 2015. In 2018, the restaurant closed temporarily for remodeling.

Country Dough closed temporarily, then permanently, during the COVID-19 pandemic. It was replaced by Seattle Dumpling Co. in 2021.

Reception 
In 2015, Angela Garbes of The Stranger said the flatbreads, jianbing, and noodles were all "excellent" and wrote, "I hope Yang sticks around so that locals and visitors alike will know his food, and Country Dough can become a part of Seattle history." Allecia Vermillion of the Seattle Metropolitan said, "Country Dough has turned a centuries-old labor-intensive Szechuan street snack into the perfect $5 modern day lunch."

In 2015, Julia Ochsenreiter of Eater Seattle wrote, "Just a few months into its existence, this lunchtime sensation from chef Cheng Biao Yang has turned our entire staff into Sichuanese sandwich addicts." In 2017, the website's Megan Hill said, "Tucked away in a (relatively) quiet corner of Pike Place Market, this small counter-service restaurant is the answer to your prayers if you’re searching for food amid the tourist throngs."

The Seattle Times included the business in a 2016 list of the top 20 new "cheap eats". Bradley Foster included the Szechuan Flatbread in Thrillist's 2016 list of "The Absolute Best Seattle Sandwiches for Under $7". The website's Naomi Tomky included the jianbing in a 2016 list of "The 50 Best Things to Eat and Drink at Pike Place Market".

See also 

 COVID-19 pandemic in Washington (state)
 History of Chinese Americans in Seattle
 Impact of the COVID-19 pandemic on the restaurant industry in the United States
 List of Chinese restaurants
 List of defunct restaurants of the United States

References

External links 

 
 Country Dough at Zomato

2015 establishments in Washington (state)
2021 disestablishments in Washington (state)
Central Waterfront, Seattle
Chinese restaurants in Seattle
Defunct Chinese restaurants in the United States
Defunct restaurants in Seattle
Restaurants disestablished during the COVID-19 pandemic
Restaurants disestablished in 2021
Restaurants established in 2015